The Polyarc reactor is a scientific tool for the measurement of organic molecules. It is paired with a flame ionization detector (FID) in a gas chromatograph (GC) to improve the sensitivity of the FID and give a uniform detector response for all organic molecules (GC-Polyarc/FID). 

The reactor converts the carbon atoms of organic molecules in GC column effluents into methane before reaching the FID. The resulting detector response is uniform on a per carbon basis and allows the FID to have a good carbon sensitivity. GC-Polyarc/FID peak areas (integrated detector responses) are equivalent on a per carbon basis, thus eliminating the need for response factors and calibration standards. The GC-Polyarc/FID method also improves the response of the FID to a number of molecules with poor/low response including, carbon monoxide (CO), carbon dioxide (CO2), carbon disulfide (CS2), carbonyl sulfide (COS), hydrogen cyanide (HCN), formamide (CH3NO), formaldehyde (CH2O) and formic acid (CH2O2), because these molecules are converted to methane.

History 
The concept of using a post-column catalytic reactor to enhance the response of the FID was described by Kenneth Porter & D.H. Volman, for the reduction of carbon dioxide and carbon monoxide to methane using a nickel catalyst. This process was later refined by Johns & Thompson, and is now commonplace in many laboratories, colloquially referred to as a methanizer. This device is limited to the conversion of carbon dioxide and carbon monoxide to methane, and the nickel catalysts are poisoned by species such as sulfur and ethylene. 

The use of two reactors in series for the subsequent combustion and then reduction of organic molecules is described by Takuro Watanabe’s group  and Paul Dauenhauer's group using separate reactors for oxidation and reduction. The authors demonstrate the effectiveness for this technique in qualifying traceable standards and the analysis of mixtures without calibrations. 

The Polyarc reactor combines the combustion and reduction zones into a single microreactor using proprietary catalyst blends that efficiently convert organic molecules to methane and resist poisoning by sulfur and other heteroatoms.

Operating Principle

Chemical Reactions
The Polyarc reactor operates by converting organic analytes after GC separation into methane before detection by FID. The oxidation and reduction reactions occur sequentially, wherein the organic compound is first combusted to molecules of carbon dioxide, which are subsequently reduced to methane molecules. The following reactions demonstrate the combustion/reduction process for formic acid. 
 
HCO2H + 0.5O2   ↔   CO2 + H2O

CO2 + 4H2   ↔   CH4 + 2H2O

The reactions are faster compared to the time scales of typical chromatography, resulting in less peak broadening and tailing. Elements other than carbon are not ionized in the hydrogen and oxygen flames of the FID and thus do not contribute to the FID signal.

Effect on the FID
The Polyarc takes advantage of the insensitivity of the FID to atoms other than carbon, because only the CHO+ ions formed from the ionization of carbon compounds are detected. Thus, the non-methane byproducts of the reactions are not detected by the FID. 

Because all compounds pass through the catalyst bed, the reactor can transform certain species that may be hazardous, or detrimental to the performance or longevity of the FID to more benign forms (e.g., cyanide is catalytically converted to methane, water and nitrogen).

Advantages and Disadvantages

Advantages
The Polyarc reactor improves the performance of the FID and allows for easier analysis of organic molecules. The following are advantages of using the GC-Polyarc/FID setup:
 Uniform sensitivity to all organic molecules
 Increased accuracy of quantification by the elimination of errors resulting from calibrations and standards
 Decreased cost of ownership due to reduction in calibrations
 Faster analysis times due to fewer calibrations
Quantification of mixtures where standards may not be available

Disadvantages
 Cost of reactor and replacements (payback period is less than 1 yr for most labs)
 The addition of dead volume causes an increase in peak broadening depending on the GC column flow rates and molecule types.

Benefits over Methanizers
 Converts all organic compounds to methane rather than just CO and CO2 leading to uniform response for all species and more sensitive detection for a larger number of species (e.g., carbon disulfide (CS 2), carbonyl sulfide (COS), hydrogen cyanide (HCN), formamide (CH 3NO), formaldehyde (CH 2O) and formic acid (CH 2O 2)).
 Resilient to poisoning by compounds containing sulfur, halogens, nitrogen, oxygen, and others (e.g. for transformer oil gas analysis).
 Sharper peaks when compared with packed column versions of methanizers.

Operation and Data Analysis

The Polyarc reactor requires a supply of hydrogen and air to operate, which can be split from the gases that supply the FID. The user software for FID signal acquisition and analysis continues to be used and the device requires no additional software or control. The integrated detector response can be interpreted using an external or internal standard method. The internal standard method is generally preferred because it eliminates injection-to-injection variability of the GC; however, both are acceptable. 

In the external standard method, the FID signal is correlated to the concentration of carbon separately from the analysis. In practice, this entails the injection of any carbon species at varying amounts to create a plot of signal (i.e., peak area) versus injected carbon amount (e.g., moles of carbon). The user should take care to account for any sample splitting, adsorption, inlet discrimination, and leaks, or the calibration will be off. The data should form a line with a slope, m, and an intercept, b. The inverse of this line can be used to determine the amount of carbon in any subsequent injection from any compound because the detector response is uniform for all organic compounds. 

This is different from a typical FID calibration where this calibration would need to be completed for every single different compound to account for the relative response differences. The calibration should be examined periodically to certify nothing has changed in the GC over time. 

In the internal standard method, the sample is doped with a known amount of some organic molecule and the amount of all other species can be derived from their relative response to the internal standard (IS). The IS can be any organic molecule and should be chosen for ease of use and compatibility with the compounds in the mixture. For example, one could add 0.01 g of methanol as the IS to 0.9 g of gasoline. The 1 wt% mixture of methanol/gasoline is then injected and the concentration of all other species can be determined from their relative response to methanol on a carbon basis,

The effects of injection-to-injection variability resulting from different injection volumes, varying split ratios and leaks are eliminated with the internal standard method leading to high analysis precision. However, inlet discrimination caused by adsorption, reaction or preferential vaporization in the inlet can lead to accuracy issues when the internal standard is influenced differently than the analyte.   

The Polyarc/FID can be paired with other detectors that give complementary information such as the mass spectrometer or thermal conductivity detector. A multiple detector setup is possible using either a splitter (tee) to split the flow to two or more detectors at a time, or a switch/valve to allow for the selection of one detector at a time. In a splitter only a fraction of the flow goes to the detector, resulting in lower detection sensitivity. In addition, the split ratio can change as a function of temperature resulting in sample discrimination and inaccuracies in the analysis. A switch introduces a small amount of dead volume to the flow path and requires multiple injections if the analysis is to be repeated on multiple detectors.

Applications
The Polyarc system has been used for analyses in the following industries:

Chemicals: The Polyarc system can be used to determine the purity of monomer feedstocks, determine total organic carbon content, study reaction byproducts, and more.

Paints and Coatings: The Polyarc system can be used to save time by reducing calibrations for the GC/FID analysis of VOCs. A single internal (or external) standard can be used to quantify all other components in the mixture, without the need to first calibrate. 

Food, Flavor, and Fragrance: The Polyarc system coupled with a flame ionization detector (FID) can be used to accurately quantify complex mixtures using a single injection without using calibration standards. Furthermore, configuring the GC with a Polyarc/FID and MS split allows for accurate quantification and identification with a single injection

Pharmaceuticals: The Polyarc system can be used to save time for the analysis of pharmaceutical products because it does not require calibration curves, allowing for quantitative information of new materials to be obtained quickly.

Oil, Gas, and Biofuels: The Polyarc system can dramatically simplify the calibration process by reducing (or eliminating) the amount of calibration required. It will also increase the sensitivity of certain compounds in the FID, including oxygenates and other low sensitivity compounds (e.g., formic acid, formaldehyde, carbon dioxide, etc.).

As a Methanizer: The Polyarc system can be used as a methanizer in applications such as TOGA/DGA as a replacement with advantages including capillary optimization, resistance to common catalyst poisons, full linear dynamic range, and minimized complicated valving.

Other Industries: Life Sciences, Agrochemical, Environmental, Forensic, Academia, Defense, Consumer Goods & Safety, Wine, Beer, & Spirits, Halogens, and Nutraceuticals

References

Chromatography